"Quicksilver Lightning" is a song by Roger Daltrey, who at the time was the former lead singer of The Who. The track is credited as being written by Dean Pitchford and being composed by Giorgio Moroder. The track is the theme tune for the 1986 film Quicksilver starring Kevin Bacon, Jami Gertz, Paul Rodriguez, Louie Anderson, Laurence Fishburne and Rudy Ramos. The film was directed by Thomas Michael Donnelly. The film went quite unnoticed, so both the song and the film are not easily remembered.

Reception
Cash Box said that the song gives "one of rock’s enduring great voices a solid tune."

The song was released as a single in April 1986, and was a minor success on the Billboard Mainstream Rock Charts, reaching number 11.

Promotional film
A large portion of the music video was filmed in San Francisco, California, with parts of the video featuring Daltrey recording the song in a studio. The video begins with Daltrey in a taxicab, looking at documents called "Quicksilver", while Jack Casey (Kevin Bacon) rides behind him. He gets out of the cab and walks into a recording studio, then begins singing the song. The video cuts between Daltrey singing and scenes from the film.

Releases
The song was later released as the B-side to the single, "Hearts of Fire" from Daltrey's seventh solo studio album Can't Wait to See the Movie, in 1987.

B-side
The B-side "Love Me Like You Do", written by Andy Nye, was included as track six on Daltrey's sixth solo album, Under a Raging Moon, but only on the CD and tape versions, not the record version.

Compilation appearance
Other than the original single release, the track is only available on the 2005 compilation album, Moonlighting: The Anthology, released by Sanctuary.

Chart performance

Singles - Billboard Singles (North America)

See also
 Roger Daltrey discography

References

1986 songs
1986 singles
1980s ballads
Atlantic Records singles
Songs written by Giorgio Moroder
Song recordings produced by Giorgio Moroder
Songs written by Dean Pitchford